Wittmackia patentissima is a species of plant in the family Bromeliaceae. This species is endemic to Brazil.

References

patentissima
Flora of Brazil